Vetrov (from　ветер meaning wind) is a Russian masculine surname, its feminine counterpart is Vetrova. It may refer to

Vladimir Vetrov (1932–1985), Soviet KGB spy

See also
Vetrov Hill, hill in Antarctica

Russian-language surnames